Sefa may refer to:

Given name
 John Sefa Ayim, Ghanaian academic
 Orhan Sefa Kilercioğlu, Turkish politician
 Sefa İşçi (born 1996), Turkish footballer
 Sefa Kavaz (born 1997), Turkish ice hockey player
 Sefa Yılmaz (born 1990), Turkish footballer
 Sefa (musician) (Sefa Vlaarkamp, born 2000), Dutch DJ and frenchcore producer

Surname
 Jetmir Sefa, Albanian footballer
 Fatjon Sefa (born 1984), Albanian footballer
 Jetmir Sefa (born 1987), Albanian football player
 Nebi Sefa, 19th-century Albanian politician

Places
 Dasht-e Sefa, a village in Berentin Rural District, Bikah District, Rudan County, Hormozgan Province, Iran
 Sefa-utaki, a historical sacred site at Ryukyu Islands in Japan

Education
 Service d'exploitation de la formation aéronautique, former French national flight school

Other uses
 SEFA,  a make of backpack industrial breathing set formerly made by Sabre Safety

Turkish masculine given names